Godfred Bysheim (20 February 1910 – 19 March 1991) was a Norwegian footballer. He played in one match for the Norway national football team in 1936.

References

External links
 
 

1910 births
1991 deaths
Norwegian footballers
Norway international footballers
Footballers from Bergen
Association football midfielders